Fernando Domingos de Moura (born 16 April 1981 in Guarujá, São Paulo), known simply as Fernando, is a Brazilian retired footballer who played as a forward.

External links

1981 births
Living people
Footballers from São Paulo (state)
Brazilian footballers
Association football forwards
Campeonato Brasileiro Série B players
Grêmio Esportivo Anápolis players
Marília Atlético Clube players
Associação Atlética Portuguesa (Santos) players
Primeira Liga players
Liga Portugal 2 players
Segunda Divisão players
Varzim S.C. players
Moreirense F.C. players
Associação Académica de Coimbra – O.A.F. players
C.F. Os Belenenses players
Brazilian expatriate footballers
Expatriate footballers in Portugal
Brazilian expatriate sportspeople in Portugal